Henry Jacob Bigelow (March 11, 1818October 30, 1890) was an American surgeon and Professor of Surgery at Harvard University.
A dominating figure in Boston medicine for many decades, he is remembered for the Bigelow maneuver for hip dislocation, a technique for treatment of kidney stones, and other innovations. He was instrumental in bringing the anesthetic possibilities of ether to the attention of medical men, and rescuing the case of Phineas Gage from relative obscurity. He was a vocal opponent of vivisection, and played a minor role in the apprehension of the culprit in the Parkman–Webster murder case.

Biography
Bigelow was born March 11, 1818, in Boston to his mother, Mary Scollay, and his father, Jacob Bigelow who taught medicine at Harvard. Bigelow entered Harvard College at fifteen years old and, after a not entirely smooth undergraduate career (including an incident in which he discharged a musket in his Hollis Hall room) graduated in 1837. He studied medicine both at Harvard and at Dartmouth College (at the latter, under Oliver Wendell Holmes, Sr.), receiving his M.D. at Harvard in 1841. He was elected a Fellow of the American Academy of Arts and Sciences in 1846.

His "Insensibility during Surgical Operations Produced by Inhalation" (1846), detailing the discovery of ether anesthesia, was selected by readers of the New England Journal of Medicine as the "most important article in NEJM history" in commemoration of the journal's 200th anniversary.
"Dr. Harlow's case of Recovery from the passage of an Iron Bar through the Head" (1850) brought the case of Phineas Gage out of complete obscurity into merely relative obscurity, and largely neutralized remaining scepticism about the case.

Bigelow described the structure and function of the Y-ligament of the hip joint in great detail, and it still carries his name.

In 1878 he published "Lithotrity by a Single Operation", in which he described his a technique for "the crushing and removal of a stone from the bladder at one sitting."
Prior to this, surgeons would crush a bladder stone and then spend only a few minutes removing the pieces.
The remaining fragments would remain for a later session for removal.
This resulted in much discomfort and complications as the remaining fragments found an exit on their own.
Removing the entire bladder stone in one procedure was a great advancement.

Bigelow died October 30, 1890, after an accident, at his country home in Newton, Massachusetts. He is buried at Mount Auburn Cemetery. He was survived by one son, William Sturgis Bigelow.

See also 
 Dr. Henry Jacob Bigelow House
 Frank Lahey MD, founder of Lahey Clinic

References

Bibliography

External links 

 Henry Jacob Bigelow, 
Henry Jacob Bigelow papers, 1840s-1856 (inclusive), 1848-1855 (bulk). H MS c439. Harvard Medical Library, Francis A. Countway Library of Medicine, Boston, Mass.

1818 births
1890 deaths
American surgeons
Anti-vivisectionists
Harvard Medical School faculty
Fellows of the American Academy of Arts and Sciences
Harvard Medical School alumni
Physicians from Massachusetts
Burials at Mount Auburn Cemetery
People from Boston